This is a list of characters from the Kirby franchise. These characters are featured in video games and other types of media from the franchise. Many characters have been introduced into the Kirby franchise spanning across multiple decades.

Main characters

Kirby

 is the protagonist of the series and a playable character in every game except Dedede's Drum Dash Deluxe. The main games give Kirby the same basic abilities; he can walk, run, jump, float and inhale, as well as spit out or swallow his enemies. Following Kirby's Dream Land (1992), Kirby can gain the abilities of the enemies he swallowed, such as Fire (from Hot Head or Burning Leo), Sword (from Blade/Sword Knight), Fighter (from Knuckle Joe), and Cutter (from Sir Kibble).

Kirby was originally voiced by Taeko Kawata in the Kirby and the Story of the Dream Spring (1994). Since Super Smash Bros. (1999), Kirby has been voiced by Makiko Ohmoto (in exception for certain lines in the English dub of the anime, where he is voiced by Amy Birnbaum).

King Dedede

 is the antihero of the series. He is a large penguin-like bird who serves as the monarch of Dream Land. He is known for carrying a large wooden hammer, and is known to be egocentric. Dedede causes many problems for the inhabitants of Dream Land through selfish mischief, though his villainous acts are sometimes under the corrupting influences of other, more dangerous evils. Despite this, he is not truly evil and has helped Kirby several times to defeat a common enemy. Dedede has many of the same abilities as Kirby, such as being able to inhale objects and spit them back out with tremendous force, and the ability to suck in air and fly.

This character wears a distinctive combat mask and wields a giant mechanical hammer filled with multiple weapons. This version of Dedede returns in Kirby: Triple Deluxe (2014) after Dedede is brainwashed by the villain Taranza; and also appears as Dedede's Final Smash in Super Smash Bros. Ultimate (2018).

In the games, King Dedede is voiced by Kirby creator Masahiro Sakurai (Kirby 64: The Crystal Shards (2000)), Super Smash Bros. series (1999-present)) and Kirby director Shinya Kumazaki (Kirby's Return to Dream Land (2011) onward). In the anime, King Dedede is voiced by Kenichi Ogata in the Japanese version and voiced by Ted Lewis in the English dub.

Meta Knight

 is an antihero character referred to as Kirby's rival, who sometimes fights with him for varying reasons, though they often arrive at the same goal. He wears a grey-silver mask, with only eye holes to see his two yellow glowing eyes. In certain games, defeating him will result in his mask falling off, revealing an appearance similar to Kirby, though with a blue body and yellow-white eyes, which appear yellow in Kirby: Planet Robobot (2016) and Kirby Star Allies (2018). He wears a navy blue cloak that can transform into a set of wings, and he usually wields a special sword called the Galaxia Sword.

Meta Knight is voiced by Atsushi Kisaichi in Japan, Eric Stuart in the English dub of the anime, and Eric Newsome in the English version of the Super Smash Bros. series (1999–present).

Bandana Waddle Dee 
, sometimes simply called , is a Waddle Dee who wears a blue bandana and is frequently seen wielding a spear. He has developed from an insignificant joke character to one of Kirby's closest and recurring friends. He first appeared in Kirby Super Star (1996) as the first opponent in the "Megaton Punch" minigame. In Kirby Super Star Ultra (2008), he appears in the "Revenge of the King" game mode as King Dedede's loyal right-hand man. Bandana Waddle Dee also appears in Kirby Super Star Ultras "The Arena" mode as a joke boss (although in Kirby Super Star, he was just a Waddle Dee).

Beginning with Kirby's Return to Dream Land (2011), Bandana Waddle Dee transitioned into being an ally of Kirby, and was one of the game's four playable characters. He assists Kirby in both Kirby: Triple Deluxe (2014) and Kirby: Planet Robobot (2016) by providing him with items, and again as a playable character in Kirby Star Allies (2018) and Kirby and the Forgotten Land (2022). In the series' spinoffs, Bandana Waddle Dee appears as a playable character in Kirby and the Rainbow Curse, and as a CPU-controlled ally in the single-player mode of Kirby Battle Royale (2017) (using a parasol instead of a spear). He returns in Kirby Fighters 2 (2020) as one of the game's starting playable characters, using his spear move set from Star Allies.

It is implied that "The Apple Juice Song", a special arrangement of the Apple Scramble theme from Kirby Battle Royale (2017) made for the 25th anniversary of the series, is sung by Bandana Waddle Dee in-universe. A rough translation of the song indicates that he is singing about getting stronger to be on par with Kirby, in terms of power and skill. This is either because of his defeat at his hands in "Revenge of the King," or just out of admiration for him.

Main antagonists

Nightmare
, also known as Cloaked Nightmare, is the final boss of Kirby's Adventure (1993) and its remake, Kirby: Nightmare in Dream Land (2002). After Nightmare invades the miraculous Fountain of Dreams, King Dedede splits up the Star Rod into seven pieces and gives them to his friends, preventing Nightmare from spreading bad dreams. Kirby, not knowing this, finds the pieces and reunites them.

Nightmare is also the main villain of the Kirby: Right Back at Ya! (2001-2003) anime. He runs NightMare Enterprises. Unlike in Kirby's Adventure and its remake, he has sharp teeth, as opposed to the game he appeared in. He is given the name of eNeMeE in the English version. Depicted as having a more threatening person than in the game, he is instead bent on conquering the universe, and dominates much of the universe from the series' beginning. He uses his ability to create an endless number of monsters to conquer civilizations. He also sells them to unsuspecting customers for a profit, via a transportation network. His only opposition are the Star Warriors and Galaxy Soldier Army, though they are wiped out before the series begins. He is an embodiment of life's fear and suffering, and so he strives to bring more pain to increase his power, and will always exist as long as people hold fear in their hearts. In the finale, he was destroyed by Kirby using the Star Rod.

Nightmare is voiced by Banjo Ginga in the Japanese version of the anime and by Andrew Rannells in the English dub.

Nightmare appears in Super Smash Bros. for Nintendo 3DS and Wii U and Super Smash Bros. Ultimate as an assist trophy, voiced by Hisao Egawa.

An Another Dimension counterpart of Nightmare known as  appears as the main antagonist in the game Super Kirby Clash (2019). Parallel Nightmare is again voiced by Banjo Ginga.

Dark Matter and Zero
 is a cloud-like creature, commonly appearing as a black orb covered in orange blobs which it uses for flight, and possessing a single red eye. It has been depicted as both a character, and as a species, the latter of which is generally known in Japanese as 「い」 (meaning "black cloud"). It is a force of negative energy that lives a lonely existence, and initially attacked Pop Star out of jealousy for Dream Land's lifestyle, seeking to recreate it into a dark world where no one can be happy. Dark Matter can possess other beings, putting them under its control.

Dark Matter makes its debut in Kirby's Dream Land 2 (1995) and possesses King Dedede. The Rainbow Drops extract it and reveal its form as a masked, robed being wielding a magical sword. After being defeated, it assumes its small orb form as it faces Kirby. In Kirby's Dream Land 3 (1997), a massive cloud of Dark Matter appears in the Pop Star sky and possesses many of its inhabitants. After aiding various creatures in need, Kirby eventually obtains the Love-Love Stick and enters the center of the cloud known as the Hyper Zone, and defeats Dark Matter once again.

Zero itself is a large, eyeball with a red iris. He shoots blood at Kirby, making him the most mature boss in the series. After Kirby defeats him and he detaches from his white eyeball, and flies around as a faster (though considerably weaker) last-ditch effort to defeat Kirby.

Dark Matter clouds return once more in Kirby 64: The Crystal Shards (2000), where they invade Ripple Star for its Crystal. When the Crystal is shattered, Kirby sets out to reassemble the pieces on five other planets before confronting a Dark Matter creature called . Its defeat repels Dark Matter from Ripple Star, but the Crystal detects and expels a powerful presence of Dark Matter from the queen, which goes on to form a new planet. It an angelic-looking form of Zero with a halo, a band-aid (confirming that Zero's eye shell from Dream Land 3 was a last-ditch effort and effectively hurt it in the process), segmented wings, and a green spiked tail.

Dark Matter makes small cameo appearances in Kirby: Squeak Squad (2006), Kirby Super Star Ultra (2008), Kirby Mass Attack (2011), and Kirby Star Allies (2018, as Void Termina's Final Form). A clone of Dark Matter in its Kirby's Dream Land 2 form, dubbed  or Dark Matter Blade, appears as an extra boss in Kirby: Planet Robobot (2016). It was created from an unknown source by the supercomputer Star Dream; however, it is noted that Star Dream was unable to fully replicate Dark Matter's powers, as he is unable to turn into his second form (although he can still use his second form's powers when at half health).

Marx
 is the final boss in Kirby Super Star (1996) and its remake Kirby Super Star Ultra (2008). He is a round, lavender creature, similar to Kirby, but having no arms, wearing a jester hat, a bow tie, and brown shoes. He is frequently seen bouncing on a ball.

At the beginning of the sixth and final chapter, "Milky Way Wishes", Marx tells Kirby about how the Sun and Moon are fighting and that only the power of a giant mechanical creature called Nova can make them stop, sending Kirby on the adventure. Once Nova appears, Marx suddenly pushes Kirby out of the way and wishes for control over Pop Star. Explaining that he was the one who started the fight between the Sun and Moon in the first place, Marx then turns into a more powerful form of himself, which has fangs and strange yellow wings, before sending Nova on a collision course with Pop Star. As the Sun and Moon hold Nova back, Kirby rides a magical shooting Starship into Nova and disables its heart, then defeats Marx and sends him crashing into Nova to destroy them both. In Kirby Super Star Ultra, pieces of Nova fuse with Marx's dead body and revives him as the more powerful , the final boss of the new and most difficult mode "The True Arena" with a new design and improved attacks.

He makes a cameo appearance in Kirby: Squeak Squad (2006), in an unlockable picture with other series villains. In Super Smash Bros. Brawl (2008), an arrangement of the music when Kirby is battling Marx in Kirby Super Star can be played on the Halberd stage. The final boss from this game, Tabuu, also shares some similar moves and pattern with Marx (both of them created by Masahiro Sakurai) In Kirby Mass Attack, he appears as the big boss of the "Kirby Brawlball" sub-game. In Kirby's Return to Dream Land (2011), he makes a brief appearance in the crowd of the final Kirby Master 100% video, and if Kirby uses the Stone ability in Kirby's Return to Dream Land, he will occasionally turn into a stone statue of Marx in his original form bouncing on his striped ball.

He also appears in Kirby Star Allies (2018) as a playable Dream Friend, added through update 2.0.0.

He makes an appearance of the Kirby representative of the boss fights in Super Smash Bros. Ultimate (2018), through Kirby's, the Inkling's, Rosalina and Luma's, and Sephiroth's Classic Modes and also appears in World of Light.

Dark Meta Knight
 is a grey-colored Meta Knight with a scar on his mask and Dark Mind's right-hand man who appears in Kirby & the Amazing Mirror (2004) and has become a recurring character. At the beginning of the game, after Meta Knight rushes into the Mirror World, Dark Meta Knight attacks Kirby (who is taking a walk) and slices him into four, unintentionally giving him backup against the corrupted Mirror World. Then, Dark Meta Knight challenges Meta Knight to a duel. Dark Meta Knight wins the duel and Meta Knight (who is defeated), becomes trapped in the Dimensional Miror, and Dark Meta Knight slices the mirror into pieces and gives it to some other Mirror World inhabitants. Kirby and his copies to pursue him for the rest of the game until they finally collect all the Mirror Shards, leading to the Dimensional Mirror, where Dark Meta Knight resides. After his defeat, Kirby fights Dark Mind and defeats him, bringing back peace to the Mirror World. Dark Meta Knight also appears in Kirby: Triple Deluxe (2014) and possesses Queen Sectonia. In the extra mode "Dededetour!", after defeating Queen Sectonia DX, the Dimensional Mirror appears. Its influence is said to have corrupted Sectonia after it was initially gifted to her by Taranza, heavily implying Dark Meta Knight is behind the corruption due to his presence in the mirror. King Dedede then fights Dark Meta Knight inside the mirror and defeats him. Kirby can also fight Dark Meta Knight in "The True Arena" as one of the Final Four.

Dark Meta Knight appears in Kirby Star Allies (2018) as a Dream Friend through an update.

Galacta Knight
 is the greatest warrior in the galaxy and the nemesis of Meta Knight. His first appearance is in Kirby Super Star Ultra (2008), as the final boss of "Meta Knightmare Ultra". He performs unusual attacks with his sword, consisting of swipes, tornadoes, and energy blasts. He appears when Meta Knight, done with his training, wishes to the reformed Nova to fight the strongest warrior in the galaxy. Nova grants this by allowing a challenge with Galacta Knight, who is said by Nova to have been sealed away in ancient times for fear that his power was too great. He has a white mask with a plus sign on it and a hot pink body. His eyes are red and glow just like Meta Knight's, except Galacta Knight's eyes are more rectangular. He wields a purple lance with a white shield that has a purple cross on the front. As for his wings, they are angel-like and glow white. He must also be faced in "The True Arena", in which he is one of the Final Four and is fought as the penultimate boss.

He also appears in Kirby's Return to Dream Land (2011), fought right before Magolor EX in that game's own "The True Arena" mode as a secret boss. In the Meta Knightmare sub-game of Kirby: Planet Robobot (2016), Star Dream summons Galacta Knight as Meta Knight's final opponent, but Galacta Knight destroys Star Dream before fighting Meta Knight again. In Kirby Star Allies (2018), Galacta Knight appears as the apparent final boss of the Guest Star ???? Star Allies Go! sub-game.

Galacta Knight again appears as the final boss in the game Super Kirby Clash (2019) where he was summoned by Parallel Nightmare to beat Team Kirby.

Magolor
 appears in Kirby's Return to Dream Land (2011), initially as a friendly character. He travels to Dream Land on an inter-dimensional ship called the Lor Starcutter. When the ship crash lands in Dream Land, Kirby, King Dedede, Meta Knight, and Bandana Waddle Dee offer to help repair the Lor Starcutter so that he can return to a realm known as Halcandra - and as a reward for their efforts, Magolor brings Kirby and the group to Halcandra for a visit. When the group arrives, a large four-headed dragon known as Landia attacks and shoots down the Lor Starcutter for an unknown reason. Angry that they have been trapped, Magolor sends Kirby and the group to defeat Landia.

In truth, Magolor is a power-hungry villain who is secretly using the four to defeat Landia for him, so that he could obtain the Master Crown. The Master Crown grants limitless power to the wearer, and Landia is currently in possession of this crown. Magolor wishes to become the universe's ruling overlord, but he must gain the power to do so from the Master Crown. It is revealed that Magolor had fought and lost to Landia before, and in his escape attempt, he landed in Dream Land. After Landia is defeated by Kirby and the group, Magolor puts on the Master Crown and transforms into a giant floating entity with enormous power, then announces that he will start his plan by conquering Planet Popstar as his "reward" to Kirby and his friends for their help. With help from Landia, Kirby and his friends chases Magolor into another dimension and sinks the Lor Starcutter, then battles Magolor himself. After his first defeat, Magolor is seemed to been destroyed. But it's revealed that the Master Crown took control of Magolor's body. After the second defeat, the crown is broken, and Magolor is banished into another dimension where he is trapped there.

Kirby's Return to Dream Land Deluxe (2023) introduces a new game mode: Magolor Epilogue: The Interdimensional Traveler. It stars Magolor after his defeat at the hands of Kirby and his friends. Stranded in the unknown realm of another dimension and without most of his powers, Magolor sets out trying to reclaim them while also collecting fragments of a mysterious fruit called the Gem Apple. He eventually repairs the Gem Apple seed at the Ethereal Altar, but it is soon corrupted by the remnants of the Master Crown, becoming the Crowned Doomer. After its defeat, the Master Crown remnants combine with the Gem Apple, transforming into a massive tree-like being. Magolor fights the Master Crown, and eventually slices it in half with a magically enhanced Ultra Sword. Magolor opens a portal, escaping the dimension he was trapped within. The credits sequence reveals that via the portal, Magolor ends up in the village of the Dream Kingdom, the parallel version of Dream Land which is located in an alternate universe, with the Gem Apple seed, now reduced to a sapling, being planted as the village's Gem Apple tree. Having now redeemed himself, Magolor takes up residence as the Dream Kingdom's shopkeeper, leading into the events of Team Kirby Clash Deluxe and Super Kirby Clash.

Magolor returns in Kirby's Dream Collection (2012) where he builds a new theme park for Kirby, seemingly to make up for what occurred in Return to Dreamland. Here, Kirby can play through new challenge stages, during some of which he races against Magolor. During the races, he uses magic to summon enemies, as well as attack Kirby. In Kirby's Return to Dream Land Deluxe, Merry Magoland opens up, referencing his wishes in Dream Collection, and expands them. Here, Magolor is a head manager of the amusement park, providing masks and souvenir items for playing games and completing challenges.

After his appearance in Kirby's Return to Dream Land, Magolor also has made cameo appearances in other games, including Kirby: Triple Deluxe (2014, as an 8-bit keychain), Dedede's Drum Dash Deluxe (2014, as an enemy, although he doesn't deal damage), Super Smash Bros. for Wii U (2014, as a trophy), Kirby: Planet Robobot (2016, as a sticker), and Super Smash Bros. Ultimate (2018, as a spirit). He also appears as a shopkeeper in the Kirby Clash series.

He appears as a playable character in the third update for Kirby Star Allies (2018) and also appears in Kirby Fighters 2 (2020) as a playable character along with Gooey, Meta Knight, King Dedede, and Bandana Waddle Dee.

Master Crown
 appears as the true main antagonist of Kirby's Return to Dream Land and Kirby's Return to Dream Land Deluxe. If was first seen when Kirby, Magolor, and co. entered Halcandra via the Lor Starcutter, resting atop Landia's head and remaining dormant until the battle against Landia. After Landia's defeat, the Master Crown falls from its spot onto the ground, only to be seized by Magolor. Magolor then reveals that he fought Landia himself for the crown, but he lost, later fleeing to planet Planet Popstar— this is likely why Landia attacked the Lor Starcutter on sight when he returned to Halcandra. The crown transforms Magolor into a ghastly, jester-like creature as he makes his move to conquer the entire universe, starting with Popstar. When Magolor is defeated, the Master Crown manifests itself as him. After Magolor's second defeat, the Master Crown shatters, releasing its grip on Magolor. Its fragments are last seen being sent to a dimension beyond space and time alongside Magolor's unconscious body.

In Magolor Epilogue: The Interdimensional Traveler, the Master Crown remnants  transform into Crowned Doomer upon devouring the Gem Apple Seed. After the Crowned Doomer is defeated by Magolor, the Crown's remnants then possess the seed itself, turning into a giant tree-like being. After its defeat, using a magically powered Ultra Sword, Magolor manages to slice the tree in half, putting an end to the Master Crown once and for all.

Morpho Knight
 first appeared as the final boss of the extra mode in Kirby Star Allies (2018), titled Guest Star ???? Star Allies Go!, and appeared in Kirby and the Forgotten Land (2022) as the final boss of the post-game world, "Isolated Isles: Forgo Dreams". Wielding a pair of butterfly-themed swords, Morpho Knight is capable of many of the same techniques as Galacta Knight, and can also teleport and create waves of energy that corrupt the player's partners. Additionally, many of its attacks are imbued with fire, making it an even greater threat. Upon its defeat, Morpho Knight is bathed in a heavenly light and vanishes into a cloud of butterflies and hearts. Morpho Knight comes into being by landing its butterfly on a life form, possessing Galacta Knight in Kirby Star Allies and possessing Fecto Forgo in Kirby and the Forgotten Land. Its second form, Morpho Knight EX, is battled in the final difficulty of "The Ultimate Choice" mode in Kirby Star Allies. Not much is known about Morpho Knight's backstory, but on the pause screen of the battle with Morpho Knight in Kirby Star Allies, it is said that Galacta Knight was the one that brought Morpho Knight into existence. It also was going to appear in the cancelled Kirby game for the GameCube, which later became Kirby's Return to Dream Land.

Leongar
, also known as Leon appears in Kirby and the Forgotten Land (2022) as the lion-like head of the Beast Pack and the secondary antagonist of this game. Following Leongar's death at the end of the main game, Kirby collects the pieces of Leongar's soul to bring him back to life.

He is voiced by Kenta Miyake.

Fecto Forgo / Fecto Elfilis
, referred to as Specimen ID-F86, is the main antagonist of Kirby and the Forgotten Land (2022). In game, it is said to have attempted to invade the Forgotten Land's world in the past but was defeated and trapped by the natives of that world. Using its power, the natives left for "a land of dreams," leaving it within its containment. During the events of Forgotten Land, it uses its powers to open a rift to Dream Land, sucking numerous inhabitants through. It has the Beast Pack capture the Waddle Dees as a power source. After Kirby arrives in its chamber to rescue the captured Elfilin and defeats the Beast Pack's leader, Leongar, the captured Forgo breaks free and merges with Leongar and numerous Beast Pack members before eventually completing itself via the absorption of Elfilin, regaining its true form and power. Kirby manages to destroy it by ramming a truck into its weakened state.

Supporting characters

Adeleine
 (initially introduced as Ado in Kirby's Dream Land 3 (1997) is a human girl artist who came to Pop Star to study art. In Kirby 64: The Crystal Shards (2000), she appeared as one of the early boss characters taken over by Dark Matter. She is taken over and fights Kirby, and later joins with Kirby after he frees her. She has the ability to make her paintings real, either creating monsters while under the control of Dark Matter or providing Kirby with help.

Adeleine appears as a playable Dream Friend in Kirby Star Allies (2018), with Ribbon supporting her.

Dyna Blade
 is an enormous armored bird that acts as both a friend and a foe in Kirby Super Star (1996), and Kirby Super Star Ultra (2008). In her self-titled subgame, she destroys all of Dream Land's crops to feed her chicks. Kirby defeats her, not knowing this, so he ends up feeding the chicks with apples and teaching them how to fly. In "Revenge of Meta Knight", Dyna Blade returns the favor by successfully carrying Kirby onto the Halberd before the artillery forces her to retreat.

In Kirby: Right Back at Ya! (2001-2003), Dyna Blade is shown as a legendary bird that is worshiped by the citizens of Cappy Town. King Dedede hatches a plot to get rid of Kirby by tricking him into eating her egg, which infuriates Dyna Blade and causes her to chase and attack Kirby for much of the episode, until her chick appears and Kirby feeds it, placating Dyna.

In Kirby Air Ride (2003), Dyna Blade appears in City Trial mode and sometimes flies to different parts of the city until flying away altogether. The player can defeat Dyna Blade by aiming for her head to obtain multiple power-ups. In Kirby's Epic Yarn, a similar boss to Dyna Blade named Hot Wings appears as the boss of Hot Land.

Dyna Blade's most recent appearance has been in Kirby Star Allies (2018), making a cameo in Dream Land's overworld map.

Gooey
 is a blue blob with a pair of eyes and a mouth. He first appears in Kirby's Dream Land 2 (1995) as a friend of Kirby that can be rescued from a holding bag (if Kirby is already with the animal partner that's inside it). Rescuing him at least once awards a single percentage point for 100% completion. There is also a female blob similar to Gooey that must also be rescued for 100%, though she appears more rarely.

Kirby's Dream Land 3 (1997) expands on Gooey's character. He is revealed to be of the Dark Matter race but chose to be Kirby's friend instead. He can be summoned by Kirby as a helper character similar to those in Kirby Super Star (1996), controlled by either the computer or a second player. Gooey's main form of offense is to snag enemies with his tongue and spit them out like Kirby does; he cannot capture multiple enemies like Kirby can, but can use his tongue underwater. Gooey can also copy abilities like Kirby, but only when a second player is controlling him. When flying in the Hyper Zone, Gooey assumes his Dark Matter form, though he still maintains his own face. He also appears in Kirby Star Allies (2018) as a playable character through an update, and also appears in Kirby Fighters 2 (2020).

Animal Friends
Kirby's Dream Land 2 (1995) and Kirby's Dream Land 3 (1997) feature various allies that can team up with Kirby and share powers.

Kirby's Dream Land 2 introduces:
  - A brown and white hamster who can walk on ice without slipping. In Kirby's Dream Land 3, Rick can also defeat enemies by jumping on them and climbing walls, but he is the only animal partner who cannot inhale and must walk into enemies with his mouth open to eat them.
  - A wise purple owl who can fly against strong winds.
  - A blue fish (apparently a sunfish, a blue surgeon fish in anime dub) who can swim against strong currents and allow Kirby to use his inhaling attack underwater. He can also travel on land, albeit very slowly, and in Kirby's Dream Land 3 can jump on foes to defeat them.

Kirby's Dream Land 3 introduces:
  - A brown, orange, and white Japanese Bobtail that is twice the size of Kirby. He can roll Kirby up into a ball and roll him around, and can also perform double or triple-jumps and jump on foes to defeat them.
  - A small green bird (apparently a Japanese white-eye) who can perform powerful attacks when he has a Copy Ability. He can fly too, but not against strong winds.
  - A pink octopus (apparently a flapjack octopus) who can cling to ceilings, but also weighs Kirby down when he attempts to fly.

Rick, Coo, and Kine make a cameo in several games. In Kirby 64: The Crystal Shards (2000), when Kirby uses the Cutter/Stone Power Combo, he can randomly carve himself into a stone statue of his animal friends; in Kirby's Return to Dream Land (2011) as one of Stone Kirby's transformations; Kirby Mass Attack (2011), as the background image in the minigame "Kirby Quest"; in the Kirby Fighters mode of Kirby: Triple Deluxe (2014), appearing in Coo's Forest stage where they randomly appear and attack players indiscriminately. In Kirby Star Allies (2018), Rick, Coo, and Kine are a composite playable Dream Friend, while Nago, Pitch, and ChuChu appear in various attacks when Kirby uses the Cleaning ability (introduced and last seen in Dream Land 3).

Rick, Coo, and Kine also appear in the anime series Kirby: Right Back at Ya! (2001-2003). Rick lives in Whispy Wood's forest inside of Acore, a friend of Whispy who houses many woodland critters. When mentioned by other characters, Coo is often held in high regard for his wisdom and judgment. Kine is a kind but naïve fish who has a unrequited crush on Tiff. In the episode A Fish Called Kine, Kine disclosed the location of the coral reef he lives in to King Dedede so he could be brought on land to be with Tiff, not knowing Dedede planned to destroy the reef. After getting disinterested with the land, Kine helped Kirby in saving the Rainbow Coral Reef.

Rick, Coo, and Kine were respectively voiced by Makiko Ohmoto, Yūko Mizutani, and Nobuo Tobita in the Japanese version, and Andrew Rannells, Eric Stuart, and Darren Dunstan in the English dub.

Ribbon
 is a pink-haired fairy from the planet Ripple Star who appears in Kirby 64: The Crystal Shards (2000). She is a kind and brave character who attempted to escape her planet with the fairies' magical Crystal when it was invaded by Dark Matter. In space, Dark Matter blobs ambushed her, shattered the crystal, and made her fall to Pop Star, where she lands on a stargazing Kirby and pleads with him for help. Kirby agrees and they search for the Crystal shards scattered on various planets and thwart Dark Matter's invasion of Ripple Star along with Waddle Dee, Adeleine, and King Dedede. In the final battle, Ribbon and the crystal aid Kirby in defeating 0², the controlling force behind Dark Matter. In the ending cutscene of the game, she gives Kirby a kiss, blushing shyly afterward. She later makes a cameo in Kirby: Planet Robobot (2016) as a sticker and later appears in Kirby Star Allies (2018) as Adeleine's partner.

Shadow Kirby
 is a gray-colored Kirby who first appeared in Kirby & the Amazing Mirror (2004) who is the version of Kirby from the mirror universe. An antihero, Shadow Kirby starts off as antagonistic, but later allies with Kirby to save both their dimensions from the antagonist, Dark Mind. Shadow Kirby has appeared in later side-games, Kirby Fighters Deluxe (2014) and Kirby Fighters 2 (2020) as both an enemy and a playable character, with a purple translucent appearance and bright white eyes.

In Kirby Star Allies (2018), Shadow Kirby made a cameo with his original gray-colored appearance.

Taranza
 is a spider-like creature who appears in Kirby: Triple Deluxe (2018). He hails from Floralia and is a retainer to Queen Sectonia. He was sent by Queen Sectonia to kidnap Kirby but kidnaps King Dedede instead. Kirby then chases him up the Dreamstalk all the way to Royal Road, where he uses his hypnotic abilities to put King Dedede under his control. After Masked Dedede is defeated, he entreats Queen Sectonia to save him, but she does not: instead, she strikes him with a laser beam attack, prompting Taranza to switch allegiances after this betrayal. It is hinted in the in-game descriptions that Taranza used to be friends with Queen Sectonia but recently noticed some disturbing changes in her demeanor.

In Team Kirby Clash Deluxe (2017), Taranza is the main villain responsible for driving the inhabitants of the Dream Kingdom into disturbing the peace. After Kirby and his allies defeat him, he uses a magical mirror to summon dangerous monsters from another dimension. However, the game's ending reveals that the mirror was controlling Taranza the entire time, and he returns to being peaceful after it is destroyed. He is a playable character in the third update for Kirby Star Allies (2018).

Elfilin
 is a mouse-like creature who appears as a protagonist in Kirby and the Forgotten Land (2022). He is the missing, benevolent half of Fecto Elfilis. Elfilin is voiced by Kurumi Mamiya.

Enemies

Blade Knight & Sword Knight
Both debuted in Kirby's Adventure (1993), and Blade Knight still makes regular appearances, but Sword Knight hasn't been an encounterable enemy since Kirby Super Star Ultra (2008). Both can become helpers in Kirby Super Star (1996) and its remake, and Blade can become an ally in Kirby Star Allies (2018).

Both enemies are armored with big shoulder pads and helmets that hide their faces (Sword Knights have long ones with an open visor with two yellow eyes visible; Blade Knight have shorter helmets with a ponytail and a fully closed mouthguard.) The color of their armor has varied between games (and changes when made a helper or player character), but their default colors are green for Blade Knight and purple for Sword Knight. In Kirby Star Allies, a Blade Knight ally will wear a cap identical to Sword Kirby's over its helmet.

In Kirby: Right Back at Ya! (2001-2003), Blade Knight and Sword Knight are both colored green and are the loyal assistants of Meta Knight. During the war preceding the events of the series, the two were once bandits who attempted to rob Meta Knight when they were attacked by the Demon Beast WolfWrath. After Meta Knight saved them, the two abandoned their lives of crime and pledged themselves to their rescuer.

Blade Knight and Sword Knight are respectively voiced by Chiro Kanzaki and Hikaru Tokita in the Japanese version, and both by Eric Stuart in the English dub.

Cappy
 resembles a mushroom with a tan body and a red-and-white spotted cap. When Kirby attempts to inhale it, he instead sucks off its cap (to the cappy's dismay), revealing a Haniwa-like creature with a hollow mouth and eyes. Cappy does not give any ability when swallowed by Kirby.

In Kirby: Right Back at Ya! (2001-2003), Cappies are the villagers of Cappy Town, one of the series' main settings. The red-and-white spotted caps from the games are not seen at any point.

Chilly
 is a snowman-like monster who is a common enemy in the Kirby franchise. Inhaling a Chilly will provide Kirby the Ice ability.

In the Kirby: Right Back at Ya! episode "Dedede's Snow Job", Chilly appeared when the Ice Dragon was causing a snowfall in Cappy Town. Kirby managed to befriend Chilly. Kirby helped Chilly to fight the Ice Dragon. When the Ice Dragon was destroyed, the snow and Chilly began to melt.

Chilly is voiced by Yūko Mizutani in Japanese version and by Kayzie Rogers in the English dub.

Gordo
 is a common enemy in the Kirby games that resemble a spiked ball with two eyes. They are usually invincible, as they cannot be sucked in and in most games, none of Kirby's attacks can destroy them. They appear as part of King Dedede's Final Smash in Super Smash Bros. Brawl and are used in his side special, or Side B, in Super Smash Bros. for Wii U and Super Smash Bros. Ultimate. Debuting in Kirby's Dream Land (1992), similar-looking enemies appeared in other Nintendo titles of the time: Unibōs in Super Mario Land 2: 6 Golden Coins (1992), and Sea Urchins in The Legend of Zelda: Link's Awakening (1993).

Knuckle Joe
 is a martial artist based on a Muay Thai boxer who utilizes a variety of punches and kicks and gives Kirby the Fighter ability when inhaled. He first appeared in Kirby Super Star (1996), and also appears in Kirby Super Star Ultra (2008), where he is both an enemy type and a playable helper for multiplayer co-op. After a long absence, he came back as a recurring enemy in Kirby's Return to Dream Land (2011). In Kirby: Star Allies (2018), he reprises his role as the co-op character for Fighter ability.

Knuckle Joe also appears in the Super Smash Bros. (1999–present) series as a summonable Assist Trophy starting with Super Smash Bros. Brawl (2008). When summoned, he performs Vulcan Jab on the nearest enemy fighter, locking them in place before finishing them off with either Rising Break or Smash Punch.

Knuckle Joe is a recurring character in Kirby: Right Back at Ya! (2001-2003). Here he is the son of a legendary Star Warrior that was killed in war and seeks to avenge his father's death. He attacks Kirby believing him to be the killer, though Meta Knight explains that his father was killed by his hand after he was unfortunately captured and changed into a monster by Nightmare. After this, he reappears multiple times to help Kirby. Strangely, in his first appearance Knuckle Joe has purple skin and white hair while later episodes give him a color scheme closer to his games' counterpart.

In the Super Smash Bros. series (1999–present), he is voiced by Minami Takayama in the Japanese version. English localization, he is voiced by Alésia Glidewell in the games  and voiced by Kevin Kolack in the anime dub.

Waddle Dee
 are red-orange creatures with yellow feet, pear-shaped faces, and no mouth that serve as the most basic enemy in most Kirby games. They have appeared in every Kirby game to date starting with Kirby's Dream Land (1992).

In Kirby's Avalanche (1995), Waddle Dee replaces Skeleton T as the player's opponent in the first lesson.

In Kirby Super Star (1996) during the "Revenge of Meta Knight" mode, a Waddle Dee wearing a sailor hat (often named "Sailor Waddle Dee") is part of Meta Knight's crew on the Halberd. However, he is never seen outside of enemy conversation.

In Kirby 64: The Crystal Shards (2000), one Waddle Dee, in contrast to his usual role as a common enemy, helps Kirby in his adventure. Waddle Dee is, at first, possessed by Dark Matter, transformed into a Waddle Doo, and forced to engage Kirby. After defeating him, Waddle Dee returns to his peaceful self and catches up with Kirby to join his group alongside Ribbon.

An average Waddle Dee also appears as a playable character in Kirby: Canvas Curse (2005).

Multiple Waddle Dees appear in Super Smash Bros. Brawl (2008), along with Waddle Doos and Gordos, as part of King Dedede's "weapons", summoned through his side special move by being pulled from his left sleeve or by using his Final Smash, Waddle Dee Army. There are also many types of Waddle Dee such as Parasol Waddle Dee (which gives the ability), Spear Waddle Dee, Big Waddle Dee, and Golden Waddle Dee. Waddle Dee has been seen to be in other colors besides red, such as yellow (in Kirby Super Star Ultra (2008)'s "Helper to Hero" mode), gold, and purple (in the "Milky Way Wishes" mode of Kirby Super Star and its remake).

In Kirby's Epic Yarn (2010), yarn-based Waddle Dees, created by the sorcerer Yin Yarn, appear, but do not hurt Kirby unless carrying a weapon, such as a spear or bow and arrow. There are also Balloon Waddle Dees, floating from a bunch of balloons that Kirby can ride on, but the balloons eventually deflate.

In Kirby and the Forgotten Land (2022), the Waddle Dees transported to the Forgotten Land have been kidnapped by the Beast Pack. Kirby now has to rescue each one. After certain milestones of Waddle Dees rescued, the hub area of Waddle Dee Town increases.

In Kirby: Right Back at Ya! (2001-2003), the Waddle Dees are the servants of King Dedede and are commanded by a Waddle Doo who translates for them. One episode shows that the Waddle Dees can eat despite not having mouths. King Dedede and Escargoon found that the Waddle Dee can absorb food into their bodies as a way of eating as seen when the two held a cookie in front of one of them.

Waddle Doo
 is a cyclops creature with a red body, stubby arms, and orange shoes. It has a giant eyeball for a face, from which it beam attacks. If swallowed by Kirby in most Kirby games, Kirby is given the Beam ability and is able to beam attack foes. Waddle Doo first appeared in Kirby's Dream Land (1992), and has since then been consistent in his appearance in Kirby games. In Kirby 64: The Crystal Shards (2000), Waddle Doo only appeared as a version of Waddle Dee possessed by Dark Matter.

In the anime, Captain Waddle Doo is King Dedede's right-hand man as the leader of Waddle Dee troops and gives orders under King Dedede's commands. He doesn't beam attack like in the game, and instead has a small dagger for a weapon (though he never uses it outside of rallying the Waddle Dees). He is voiced by Yūko Mizutani in the Japanese version and Maddie Blaustein in the English dub.

Waddle Doo has notably gained attention from a YouTuber named Failboat, in which one tries to hit Kirby with its beam while shouting "Beam attack!", only for it to be killed by Kirby in the Robobot Armor from Kirby: Planet Robobot and go to heaven.

Bosses

Chef Kawasaki
He throws dishes and uses a frying pan that extends in an attempt to catch and fry Kirby for damage. He gives Kirby the Cook ability which is also used in Super Smash Bros. Brawl (2008) as Kirby's Final Smash. However, he appears as a friendly character in Kirby's Dream Land 3 (1997), where he plays a game with Kirby. He can become a Friend in Kirby Star Allies (2018) if Kirby uses a Friend Heart on him after defeating him. He also appears in Super Smash Bros. Ultimate (2018) as an Assist Trophy.

He also appears in the anime Kirby: Right Back at Ya! where he runs the only restaurant in Cappy Town. His enthusiasm is incredible, but the same cannot be said for the quality of his meals. Kawasaki is voiced by Nobuo Tobita in the Japanese version and Maddie Blaustein impersonating Ed Wynn in the English dub.

Kracko
 is a boss that first appears in Kirby's Dream Land (1992). It resembles a large cumulus cloud with spikes protruding from all sides, and a single large eyeball in the center. It attacks with electricity, rain, and by producing smaller enemies, such as Waddle Doos. Kracko is typically first seen in a weaker form, sometimes called . Its characteristic eye remains, but it is surrounded by four balls, which it either spins slowly or launches at Kirby. It usually drops Waddle Doos or bombs at Kirby. This form either fights as a mini-boss earlier in various games, or immediately prior to transforming to its "adult" form. Kracko is slightly different in Kirby Super Star (Ultra) in that Kracko Jr. and Kracko are two separate bosses. In Kirby's Dream Land 3 (1997), an illusion of Kracko in its adult form is drawn up and brought to life by Ado to fight for her, and is the last monster to be drawn.

Kracko appears in the Kirby: Right Back at Ya! episode "Dark and Stormy Knight" where it appears as a monster purchased by King Dedede from NightMare Enterprises to defeat Kirby. For most of the episode, Kracko appeared as a storm cloud that shot lightning throughout Cappytown. But when Kirby flew inside it, Kracko shot electric sword beams at Kirby, giving him the Sword ability. Kirby shot five sword beams back with the last one splitting Kracko in half. Kracko was shown the same way it is in the games. It was voiced by Chiro Kanzaki.

Kracko is also a surprise boss in Kirby & the Amazing Mirror (2004). Unlike most bosses in Kirby & the Amazing Mirror, Kracko is not a mirror copy, but has no copy and is the original boss. In Kirby: Squeak Squad (2006), a gray, robot version called  appears as a boss.

In Kirby: Triple Deluxe, Kracko returns as a boss, encountered in Old Odyssey. According to its in-game description, it has made Floralia part of its territory and is being fed by a mysterious power source, making its attacks stronger than ever before. In Dededetour, King Dedede fights , Kracko's stronger form.

Both clouds fight against Kirby and his allies after the original Kracko is defeated.

Lololo & Lalala
 appear once as the second boss fight in Kirby's Dream Land (1992), where they push objects in an attempt to hurt Kirby. They appear to be parodies of Lolo and Lala, the protagonists of HAL's Eggerland series (1985-2000) of games.

They appear in the anime as friendly characters, where they are known as Fololo & Falala in the English dub, and they reside in King Dedede's castle. They are originally a single monster created by NightMare Enterprises called , but it is split into two by Slice n' Splice and sent to Dedede at the suggestion to the N.M.E. Sales Guy by Nightmare.

In the Japanese version of the anime, Lola and Lololo are voiced by Chiro Kanzaki and Lalala is voiced by Madoka Akita. In the English dub, Fofa, Fololo, and Falala are all voiced by Tara Jayne Sands.

Meta-Knights
The  are an army led by Meta Knight, who often uses them to test Kirby's skills throughout Kirby's Adventure (1993), which is their first appearance. They are four distinct armored soldiers that each wield the weapon they are named after. The Meta-Knights return prominently in Kirby Super Star (1996), where they aided Meta Knight in his attempt to conquer Dream Land via his armored airship, the Halberd. They also appeared in some other game modes, also fighting as a team. A version of them can also be summoned by Galacta Knight.

Whispy Woods
 is a large apple tree whose most common attack is dropping apples from his branches. He generally appears as a boss, usually, the first one in many Kirby games, and was the first boss to appear in the Kirby series back in Kirby's Dream Land (1992). Also, in Kirby Super Star (1996) (and its 2008 remake) there exists a related pair of creatures named , and they can be found in Milky Way Wishes, Revenge of Meta Knight, Meta Knightmare Ultra, The Arena, and Helper to Hero. This time, its leaves are purple and it can drop poisonous apples and worms. It can also drop Gordos like Twin Woods, and shoot gusts of wind and small twisters.

Whispy makes appearances in the Super Smash Bros. series (1999–present). He can be seen in Kirby-based stages, blowing wind at the characters and dropping apples.

In Kirby & the Amazing Mirror (2004), a similar creature called  appears, its appearance and attacks identical to that of Whispy Woods. In Kirby: Triple Deluxe (2014), Whispy appears as a stage in Kirby Fighters multiplayer. In Story Mode, Taranza uses his power on a nearby plant which grows into  and is the game's first boss. Unlike Whispy Woods, Flowery Woods can uproot itself and can attack using its roots. According to its in-game description, Flowery Woods DX's relation to Whispy Woods is unclear. In Kirby: Planet Robobot (2016), a mechanical version of Whispy appears called , in Kirby: Star Allies (2018), an aged version of Whispy called  appears alongside Whispy Woods, and in Kirby and the Forgotten Land (2022) a palm tree version of Whispy called  appears as the boss of Everbay Coast.

The anime features him as the king of the forest in Dream Land. Whispy is several hundred years old, and very wise, though he has a bit of a temper. He's very kind to his friends, but shows no mercy to those that threaten his kingdom. At first, he believes Kirby and his friends are intruders when they build a campfire around him. It turns out to be a setup by Dedede, who wants to destroy Whispy to build a golf course. After most of the forest is cut down, it is revived by one of Whispy's apples. Dedede continues to constantly try to build his golf course during the series while Whispy becomes Kirby's ally.

He is voiced by Osamu Hosoi in the Japanese version of the anime, and Dan Green in the English dub.

Kirby: Right Back at Ya! characters
These characters only appeared in the anime series Kirby: Right Back at Ya! and not in any particular games to date.

Escargoon
 is a purple anthropomorphic snail that serves King Dedede in the anime series. He originally left his mother's farm to become famous and make his mother proud, but ended up serving Dedede instead as his personal assistant. He helps Dedede's plots by creating various inventions to help defeat Kirby. King Dedede smashes Escargoon as much as he does Kirby, but his loyalty never waivers.

Escargoon is voiced by Naoki Tatsuta in the Japanese version and Ted Lewis impersonating Paul Lynde in the English dub.

Although he was an anime-exclusive character, Escargoon makes a cameo appearance in Kirby Mass Attack (2011), as part of one of King Dedede's attacks (along with several Waddle Dees and Captain Waddle Doo, another Right Back at Ya! character) in the sub-game Kirby Quest.

Sir Ebrum & Lady Like
Sir Ebrum works as the Cabinet Minister. Lady Like is usually the one out of the two who is suspicious of Dedede's plots since they put her children in danger as well, although even Sir Ebrum gets suspicious sometimes.

Sir Ebrum is voiced by Takashi Nagasako in the Japanese version and David Lapkin in the English dub. Lady Like is voiced by Yuko Mizutani in the Japanese version and Kayzie Rogers impersonating Eva Gabor in the English dub.

Tiff & Tuff
They live in the castle of King Dedede with their parents and help Kirby in his fight against Dedede's plots and Nightmare's monsters. Tiff is more interested in academics such as chemistry and other studies while Tuff is active in sports and other physical activities.

Tiff is voiced by Sayuri Yoshida in the original Japanese version and Kerry Williams in the English dub. Tuff is voiced by Rika Komatsu in the Japanese version and Kayzie Rogers in the English dub.

Biblio
 is a Cappy who wears glasses and runs a book store in Cappy Town. He first appeared in "Watermelon Felon" and serves as one of the later introduced characters in the anime.

Chief Bookem
 is a Cappy police chief who is the only police officer in Cappy Town. He has a large grey mustache and lives in his house/police station with his wife Buttercup. There isn't much for him to do, but doesn't let that discourage him. One day, Bookem notices a notorious Cappy criminal Doron causing trouble in Cappy Town, he puts Doron in jail. In the episode "Hail to the Chief", he said that he was a former member of a military group called the Rough Ranger Corps. This, however, turned out to be a false story he told to the children of Cappy Town to entertain them and it was his brother who was in the Rangers.

He is voiced by Atsushi Kisaichi in the Japanese version. In the English dub, he was voiced by Jerry Lobozzo (ep 1-75) and Andrew Rannells (ep 76-100).

Buttercup
 is the loving wife of Chief Bookem.

She is voiced by Madoka Akita in the Japanese version and Lisa Ortiz in the English dub.

Cappy kids
The Cappy kids are Cappy Town's three youths who are friends of Tuff, as well as Tiff and Kirby.

 wears a beige boater hat and a green shirt, and is the tallest and the oldest of the three. He is known for pulling pranks and causing trouble for the Cappies.  wears two pigtails with beaded ties, and is youngest and smallest of the Cappy children. She is shown as being clingy to Spikehead.  wears a dark green headband that spikes his hair up, and is the pushiest amongst the three. Honey and Spikehead have a crush on each other, and are eventually stated to be boyfriend and girlfriend.

Spikehead, Honey, and Iro respectively are voiced by Chiro Kanzaki, Madoka Akita, and Makiko Ohmoto in the Japanese version; and Amy Birnbaum, Kayzie Rogers, and Jim Napolitano in the English dub. Many fans of the anime often confuse Spikehead for a female because of his voice. The characters' names in the Japanese version in the previous order are a pun on the solfège いろはにほへと i ro ha ni ho he to.

Doron
 is a quiet Cappy criminal who often commits crimes in Cappy Town such as shoplifting and stealing items from the citizens and is often seen in a jail cell at the Cappy Town Police Station. He has a circle-shaped beard. Based on the tendency to steal items, Doron is likely to be a kleptomaniac; this is supported by the fact that he stole a portrait from King Dedede's art gallery in "Dedede's Monsterpiece" and runs away with Sir Ebrum's ring in "The Thing About the Ring". His name comes from a Japanese word for "thief" 泥棒, dorobō.

He is voiced by Nobuo Tobita in the Japanese version.

Gengu
 is a Cappy who is the shopkeeper of a toy store in Cappy Town and is also a good toy designer. Gengu is sometimes be seen with Tuggle. He carries a wrench at times.

He is voiced by Mizuki Saitoh in the Japanese version and by David Lapkin in the English dub.

Gus
 is an overall-wearing Cappy who is a skilled mechanic and the owner of a gas station. He employed Kirby for a short period, but since only King Dedede and the Mayor have cars, it doesn't seem like he'd get much of his business, but he also fixes King Dedede's car every time it's damaged. In "Born to Be Mild", it is revealed that Gus used to be part of a biker gang with Fang, and both thought they could beat the legendary biker Steppenwolf in a race. However, Steppenwolf defeated Fang and reminded Gus that being a biker was about freedom instead of breaking the rules. From that day on, Gus vowed to never ride a bike again, but ultimately changed his mind when Tiff and Tuff convinced him that he was Cappy Town's only hope of winning its second race against Fang.

He is voiced by Osamu Hasoi in the Japanese version and by Eric Stuart in the English dub.

Mabel
 is a Cappy, and Cappy Town's residential fortune teller. The Cappies often go to her in order to have their future predicted or to help solve their woes. Later in the series, Mabel reveals that she really doesn't have any psychic powers, but still takes delight in helping the Cappies solve their problems. Mabel simply listens to what Samo overhears at the bar. After learning what is on each of the Cappies' minds, she can easily give them advice in the form of one of her predictions.

Mabel is voiced by Yūko Mizutani in the Japanese version and by Amy Birnbaum in the English dub.

Mayor Len Blustergas
 is a Cappy and the Mayor of Cappy Town. He lives with his wife Hana, his three grandchildren, and his large flock of sheep. Despite being the Mayor of Cappy Town however, he has little freedom to run it freely due to the dictatorship of King Dedede who sometimes enforces unfair laws for his own selfish deeds. Nonetheless, the town's Cappies continue to respect Mayor Len for his efforts.

He is voiced by Takashi Nagasako in the Japanese version and by Mike Pollock in the English dub.

Hana
, Mrs. Blustergas in the English dub, is a Cappy resident of Cappy Town and the wife of Mayor Len Blustergas.

She is voiced by Chiro Kanzaki in the Japanese version and by Kayzie Rogers in the English dub.

Melman
 is an elderly Cappy and Cappy Town's residential mailman. In the episode "Born to Be Mild" Pt. 2, it is discovered that Melman is also the legendary biker .

He is voiced by Nobuo Tobita in the Japanese version and by Maddie Blaustein in the English version.

Professor Curio
 is an elderly Cappy who is a respected citizen of Cappy Town and carries his satchel at all times. Curio runs an antique shop/museum where he displays his artifacts of ancient Dream Land and a long lost Cappy civilization. Besides collecting ancient artifacts, Curio also finds solace by learning about the past in his free time as well.

He is voiced by Takeshi Nagasako in the Japanese version and Maddie Blaustein in the English dub.

Samo
 is a Cappy who is the owner and bartender of a bar (specifically a juice bar in English edit) in Cappy Town. Upon hearing the problems of the Cappies that visit his bar, Samo relays them to Mabel. He is one of the few who knows she isn't a true psychic, not that he minds. They both care about each other, though Samo tends to get a bit sappy.

He is voiced by Nobuo Tobita in the Japanese version and by Mike Pollock in the English dub.

Tokkori
 is a selfish bird that uses Kirby for protection purposes. His first appearance in the anime is the very beginning of the first episode as a cameo, sleeping. In A Blockbuster Battle, when a storm comes and Kirby needs to find shelter, he accidentally takes Tokkori's nest. When Kirby needs a job, King Dedede tells Tokkori to sabotage Kirby's attempts to find work. At the end, Tiff and Tuff build a little house for Kirby. In the third episode, Tuff finds that Tokkori took Kirby's house. Now, he rarely lets Kirby sleep in the house or just lets him in for some rest while he watches Channel DDD. However, he has shown kindness towards Kirby, even if it's in a superficial way. In "Buccaneer Birdy", Tokkori is believed to be a descendant of a royal bird called Lord James Coleet that belonged to an old pirate named Captain Kick. However, this is revealed to not be the case, but Tiff alters the picture upon discovering the truth so that the Cappies still think it is true. Nevertheless, Tokkori refuses to be seen as royalty anymore, once again preferring to have things to complain about.

He is voiced by Fujiko Takimoto in the Japanese version and Kevin Kolack in the English dub.

Tuggle
 is a Cappy who is the shopkeeper of Cappy Town's grocery store, one of a few places to get a steady flow of business. Tuggle would sometimes be see seen with Gengu. He wears a green hat and apron with two sun symbols in the bottom.

He is voiced by Mizuki Saitoh in the Japanese version and Maddie Blaustein in the English dub.

Yabui
 is a Cappy who is the only doctor in Cappy Town where he is also a dentist. He runs a small, low tech clinic, but doesn't get many bad cases aside from colds, toothaches, and the occasional case of sleeping sickness. Many of the Cappies don't like visiting Yabui as he utilizes painful strategies of fighting cavities. His eyes and mouth are hidden by his glasses and a light grey mustache. Unlike the other cappies, Yabui is the only one who has hands.

He is voiced by Sekine Kazunori in the Japanese version and David Lapkin in the English dub.

NightMare Enterprises
, commonly N.M.E., is an organization led by Nightmare. Its purpose is creating monsters then selling them to unsuspecting customers through the internet in order to spread Nightmare's empire. Besides the monsters and by-products, N.M.E. also creates different tools of warfare, ranging from laser guns to large ships. The company is housed by a massive spaceship with an eye on its front and cyberspace cities on its exterior. N.M.E. also sounds like "enemy", seeing how everything that comes from there is an enemy of Kirby.

N.M.E. Sales Guy
The  is the company's main employee who sells monsters to King Dedede over the Internet. In the Japanese version, he speaks politely, but still doesn't pass up the chance to insult customers. However, in the dub, his personality is more that of a stereotypical used car salesman. The Sales Guy answers to Nightmare and tends to overcharge King Dedede for his purchases. In "New Year! Kirby Quiz Show" ("The Kirby Quiz" in the dub), he hosts a quiz show to welcome the new year with questions about the series. Until the final episode, only the top half of his body is shown, giving the illusion of him being a tall human. In the finale, he is revealed to be very short with tiny Kirby-like feet below his waist. When Dedede and Escargoon meet him in person, they decide to get revenge on the Sales Guy for all the trouble he gave them by feeding him Chef Kawasaki's horrid cooking.

Although he is considered an anime-only character, the Sales Guy appears in Kirby Mass Attack (2011) in the sub-game Strato Patrol EOS at the game over screen.

The Sales Guy is voiced by Banjo Ginga in the Japanese version and Dan Green in the English dub.

Notes

References

Kirby